is a railway station on the Osaka Metro Yotsubashi Line in Nishi-ku, Osaka, Japan.

Connecting line
Keihan Railway Nakanoshima Line (Watanabebashi Station)

Layout
There is an island platform with two tracks on the second basement.

Surroundings
Daido Life
Nakanoshima Festival Tower East
Festival Plaza
Festival Hall
Asahi Shimbun
Osaka Science Museum
The National Museum of Art, Osaka
Kansai Electric Power Co., Inc.

Buses
Higobashi (Osaka City Bus)
Routes 62, 75, 88A and 103 for Osaka-ekimae
Route 88 for Osaka-ekimae / for Tempozan

References

External links

 Official Site 
 Official Site 

Railway stations in Osaka Prefecture
Railway stations in Japan opened in 1965
Osaka Metro stations